The canton of Guérigny is an administrative division of the Nièvre department, central France. Its borders were modified at the French canton reorganisation which came into effect in March 2015. Its seat is in Guérigny.

It consists of the following communes:
 
Anlezy
Bazolles
Beaumont-Sardolles
Billy-Chevannes
Bona
Cizely
Crux-la-Ville
Diennes-Aubigny
La Fermeté
Fertrève
Frasnay-Reugny
Guérigny
Jailly
Limon
Montigny-aux-Amognes
Nolay
Poiseux
Rouy
Saint-Benin-d'Azy
Saint-Benin-des-Bois
Sainte-Marie
Saint-Firmin
Saint-Franchy
Saint-Jean-aux-Amognes
Saint-Maurice
Saint-Martin-d'Heuille
Saint-Saulge
Saint-Sulpice
Saxi-Bourdon
Urzy
Vaux d'Amognes
Ville-Langy

References

Cantons of Nièvre